Nikita Franciscus Wilson (born February 25, 1964) is a retired American professional basketball player.  He was selected by the National Basketball Association's Portland Trail Blazers with the 30th overall pick in the second round of the 1987 NBA draft.

Wilson, whose nickname is simply "Bun," played at Leesville High School in Louisiana, was a member of the 1983 Parade All-American Fourth Team for High School in the U.S. and college basketball 1983-1987 at Louisiana State University. He saw action in fifteen games for the Trail Blazers during the 1987-88 NBA season, averaging 1.3 points. He has extensive overseas experience, primarily in France.

External links
 Nikita Wilson bio from basketball-reference.com

1964 births
Living people
American expatriate basketball people in Spain
American men's basketball players
Basketball players from Louisiana
Fort Wayne Fury players
Grand Rapids Hoops players
Hartford Hellcats players
Liga ACB players
LSU Tigers basketball players
Parade High School All-Americans (boys' basketball)
People from Leesville, Louisiana
People from Pineville, Louisiana
Portland Trail Blazers draft picks
Portland Trail Blazers players
Power forwards (basketball)
Rapid City Thrillers players
Rochester Renegade players
Rockford Lightning players
Saski Baskonia players
Small forwards
American expatriate basketball people in the Philippines
Philippine Basketball Association imports
Sta. Lucia Realtors players
Sportspeople from Rapides Parish, Louisiana